Red Beach, located in Dawa County, Panjin, Liaoning, China, is famous for its landscape featuring the red plant of Suaeda salsa of the family Chenopodiaceae. It is based in the biggest wetland and reed marsh in the world. The landscape is composed of shallow seas and tide-lands.

Formation
The Sueda  is one of the few species of plant that can live in highly alkaline soil. Its growth cycle starts in April when it is colored light red, while the color of the mature species is deep red.

The nature protection area
Panjin Shuangtaizi River mouth state-level nature protection area preserves a very large, ecologically intact wetland. More than 260 kinds of birds and 399 kinds of wild animals live in it. It was promoted to the state-level nature protection area in 1988 and has applied to join the International person and biosphere protectorate network.

Surrounding area
The largest reed marsh in Asia is also located here, attracting many tourists. The reeds are used to make paper. The red-crowned crane (Grus japonensis) also reproduces here and it is also the endangered black-mouth gull's largest breeding area.

References

External links
Sightseeing in Panjin City (in Chinese)

Beaches of China
Landforms of Liaoning
Tourist attractions in Liaoning